A point source of pollution is a single identifiable source of air, water, thermal, noise or light pollution. A point source has negligible extent, distinguishing it from other pollution source geometries (such as nonpoint source or area source). The sources are called point sources because in mathematical modeling, they can be approximated as a mathematical point to simplify analysis. Pollution point sources are identical to other physics, engineering, optics, and chemistry point sources and include: 
 Air pollution from an industrial source (rather than an airport or a road, considered a line source, or a forest fire, which is considered an area source, or volume source)
Water pollution from factories, power plants, municipal sewage treatment plants and some farms (see concentrated animal feeding operation). The U.S. Clean Water Act also defines municipal separate storm sewer systems and industrial stormwater discharges (such as construction sites) as point sources.
 Noise pollution from a jet engine
 Disruptive seismic vibration from a localized seismic study
 Light pollution from an intrusive street light
 Radio emissions from an interference-producing electrical device

See also
 Nonpoint source pollution
 United States regulation of point source water pollution

References

Pollution
Transboundary environmental issues